Heparanase (Hpa1 heparanase, Hpa1, heparanase 1, heparanase-1, C1A heparanase, HPSE) is an enzyme with systematic name heparan sulfate N-sulfo-D-glucosamine endoglucanase. This enzyme catalyses the following chemical reaction

 endohydrolysis of (1->4)-beta-D-glycosidic bonds of heparan sulfate chains in heparan sulfate proteoglycan

Heparanase cleaves the linkage between a glucuronic acid unit and an N-sulfo glucosamine unit carrying either a 3-O-sulfo or a 6-O-sulfo group.

See also 
 Heparanase

References

External links 
 

EC 3.2.1